This is a list of events from British radio in 1939.

Events

January to May
No events.

June
 14 June – Clevedon and Start Point transmitting stations begin broadcasting the BBC Regional Programme for the West of England, partly replacing Washford.

July
No events.

August
 August – The BBC Monitoring service is established at Wood Norton Hall in Worcestershire, acquired earlier in the year as a standby location in case of the need to evacuate facilities from London.

September
 1 September – At 18.55 local time BBC engineers receive the order to begin closing down all transmitters in preparation for wartime broadcasting: this marks the end of the National and Regional Programmes of the BBC. At 20.15 the BBC's Home Service begins transmission: this will be the corporation's only domestic radio channel for the first four months of World War II (BBC Television has been shut down until 1946). There will be a daily Welsh language bulletin of world news at 5 pm. Programming is initially limited to news, announcements, gramophone records and live music played by a limited pool of staff musicians, with extensive use of cinema organist Sandy MacPherson.
 3 September
 Prime Minister Neville Chamberlain, introduced by Alvar Lidell and speaking from 10 Downing Street, announces on the BBC at 11.15 local time that "this country is at war with Germany".
 Yorkshire-born novelist and playwright J. B. Priestley reads the first installment of his novel Let the People Sing, a celebration of local democracy specially written for radio, on the Home Service.
 19 September – Popular British radio comedy show It's That Man Again with Tommy Handley is first broadcast on the BBC Home service, following trial broadcasts from 12 July. Known as "ITMA", and also featuring Jack Train and many others, it runs until Handley’s death in 1949;  the performers have initially been evacuated to Bristol.

October
No events.

November
No events.

December
 25 December – In his Christmas broadcast on BBC Radio,  King George VI quotes Minnie Louise Haskins' poem "The Gate of the Year".

Station debut
 1 September – BBC Home Service (1939–1967)

Debuts
 12 July – It's That Man Again (1939–1949)
 25 September – Singing Together on BBC Radio schools service (1939–2001)

Continuing radio programmes

1930s
 In Town Tonight (1933–1960)

Births
 23 January – Vincent Duggleby, personal finance radio presenter
 4 March – Keith Skues, radio presenter
 23 April – Tom Vernon, broadcaster (died 2013)
 5 May – Ray Gosling, broadcast documentary maker (died 2013)
 7 May – David Hatch, radio executive and performer (died 2007)
 11 July – John Walters, radio music producer and jazz trumpeter (died 2001)
 30 August – John Peel, born John Ravenscroft, DJ (died 2004)
 19 September – Louise Botting, radio presenter and businesswoman
 1 October – Geoffrey Whitehead, comic actor
 27 October – John Cleese, comic actor

Deaths
 20 July – Sir Dan Godfrey, orchestral conductor, 71
 19 December – Eric Fogg, composer and conductor, 36 (killed by Underground train)

See also 
 1939 in British music
 1939 in British television
 1939 in the United Kingdom
 List of British films of 1939

References 

 
Years in British radio
Radio